Jean-Christophe Lerondeau (born 27 June 1963) is a French ice hockey player. He competed in the men's tournament at the 1988 Winter Olympics.

References

1963 births
Living people
Olympic ice hockey players of France
Ice hockey players at the 1988 Winter Olympics
People from Juvisy-sur-Orge
Sportspeople from Essonne
20th-century French people